Dechristianize is the fifth album by American death metal band Vital Remains. It was released on August 22, 2003. The lyrics deal with the Dechristianization of France during the French Revolution. The intro - "Let the Killing Begin" - features a section of Carl Orff's "O Fortuna" and voices from the film The Greatest Story Ever Told. This album was the first to feature Deicide vocalist Glen Benton, and is generally considered to be the band's breakthrough album.

Track listing
All songs by Tony Lazaro and Dave Suzuki.

Personnel
Vital Remains
Glen Benton - vocals
Tony Lazaro - rhythm guitar
Dave Suzuki - lead guitar, bass guitar, drums

Production
Mark Prator - Mixing, Engineer
Aaron Caillier  - Engineer
Robert Pemberton - Remixing, Engineer
Todd Jessop - Engineer
Roger Lian - Mastering
Jaromír "Deather" Bezruč - Cover Art
Joe Rooney - Photos

References

2003 albums
Vital Remains albums
Century Media Records albums